Philip D'Oyly "Pip" Torrens (born 2 June 1960) is an English actor.

Torrens portrayed courtier Tommy Lascelles in the Netflix drama The Crown, aristocrat Lord Massen in the HBO series The Nevers, Herrn Klaus Helmut Starr in Preacher, and held leading roles in Poldark and Versailles. His film appearances include The Danish Girl, The Iron Lady, War Horse and Star Wars: The Force Awakens. He has played The Curator in Supermassive Games' Dark Pictures Anthology series of horror video games since 2019, appearing in four entries to date.

Early life and education
Son of Rev. Robert Harrington Torrens, MA, and descendant of the lawyer and colonial official Henry Whitelock Torrens, Torrens was born in Bromley, Kent, and educated at Bloxham School. He studied English Literature at Trinity College, Cambridge (BA 1981, MA 1987), and subsequently studied acting at Drama Studio London.

Career
Torrens's television appearances include Consenting Adults, two episodes of Jeeves and Wooster, two episodes of Doctor Who ("Human Nature"/"The Family of Blood"), The Brittas Empire, Green Wing, Silk, The Government Inspector (as John Scarlett), The Last Detective and DI Spencer for a few episodes in The Bill in 2001. He has also appeared in a 2008 series of British television advertisements for First Direct, with Matthew King. He appeared also in a 1992 episode of Maigret with Michael Gambon.

In 2011, Torrens appeared in both episodes of an Outnumbered two-part special. In 2012 he appeared in the first episode of series 8 of Hustle as Heinz Zimmermann and also presented new gameshow The Devil's Dinner Party. Torrens briefly appeared in an episode of Death in Paradise in 2013, as a museum guide. His film appearances include Tomorrow Never Dies as the captain of the fictional HMS Bedford, the 2001 film To End All Wars and voicework for Valiant.

In 2013, Torrens appeared in "The Waldo Moment", an episode of the anthology series Black Mirror. In November 2014, Torrens played the part of Richard Grenville in the BBC Radio 4 drama The Archers.  In 2017 he began a starring role on American television series Preacher, on which he appeared in 33 episodes as Herr Klaus Helmut Starr.

Filmography

Film

Television

Video games

References

External links
 
 Pip Torrens profile, bfi.org; accessed 19 April 2016.

1960 births
Living people
People from Bromley
Alumni of Trinity College, Cambridge
English male film actors
English male television actors
Male actors from Kent
20th-century English male actors
21st-century English male actors
People educated at Bloxham School